The Niagara Falls International Marathon is an annual marathon running competition from Buffalo, New York, United States to Niagara Falls, Ontario, Canada, first held in 1974.

It is one of the few marathons in the world that starts in one country and finishes in another. Some other marathons cross international borders but return to the start, like the Monaco Marathon and the Unionsmarathon. The Niagara Falls International Marathon passes a border control, while the mentioned European borders have no border control thanks to the Schengen Union. The participants of the Niagara Falls Marathon have to show passport or NEXUS card at the start, which will be given back at the finish line or kept by the racer during the race.

History 

The marathon was first held in 1974 as the Skylon International Marathon, with Jesse Kregal as founder and race director.  The race was named the Buffalo Niagara Falls International Marathon from 1983 to 1986.

In 1985, runners were led off the course, and used multiple different routes to get back on the course, resulting in unusual times and placements.

The marathon had a ten-year break from 1987 to 1996 before it was relaunched in 1997 as the Niagara Falls Marathon.  From 1998 to 2008, it was known as the Casino Niagara International Marathon.

The course records are held by Peter Pfitzinger, who ran 2:17:10 in 1980, and Nicole Stevenson of Canada, whose time of 2:37:09 in 2004 is the women's record.

The 2020 edition of the race was cancelled due to the coronavirus pandemic.

Course

The marathon begins in Buffalo, New York at the Albright-Knox Art Gallery. The first  are along the historic parkways of Buffalo before crossing the Peace Bridge into Fort Erie, Ontario, Canada. The remainder of the route is in Canada. After a very brief segment following the Queen Elizabeth Way, the route curves south and then north again along the Niagara Parkway, a landscaped road which winds along the Niagara River. Kilometer 42, the end of the race, faces the Niagara Falls on the U.S.-Canada international border in the city of Niagara Falls, Ontario.

Winners 
Key:

See also
 List of marathon races in North America

Notes

References

External links
Niagara Falls Marathon

Marathons in Canada
Marathons in the United States
Recurring sporting events established in 1974
Cross-border races